The Oreca 05 is a Le Mans Prototype built by Oreca in 2015. 

The car was designed to compete in the LMP2 class. The car's first win came at the 2015 24 Hours of Le Mans by Hong Kong-based team KCMG. A closed-top design, it incorporates several new mechanical and safety features not used in the Oreca 03 car. Zylon anti-intrusion panels are built into the frame that prevent any mechanical components from coming into the chassis in the event of an accident. The car is smaller than the normal LMP2 class; the 05's frame is 1900mm wide while most other cars have a 2000mm frame. The 05 has an electrical power steering system and an improved gearbox.

As a majority of existing cars being rebuilt into the 07, only three 05s, including the Alpine, are known to currently exist in its original form.

Alpine A460

French car manufacturer Alpine raced the Alpine A460 in the 2016 FIA World Endurance Championship.  This car is technically identical to the Oreca 05, using the same chassis and internals, with Alpine branding.  This is the successor to the Alpine A450, which Alpine raced in the 2015 FIA World Endurance Championship season.

References

External links

Le Mans Prototypes
24 Hours of Le Mans race cars